Ivan Karizna is a French cellist. He was bronze medalist at the International Tchaikovsky Competition in 2011 and ended 5th in the 2017 Queen Elisabeth Competition for cello.

Biography
Ivan Karizna was born in Dzyatlava, Belarus and got interested in cello music when he was five years old. By the age of eight he played his very first performance and since then performed at such festivals as the Belarusian Yuri Bashmet International Festival as well as Moscow Welcomes Friends of Russia and Belgian Musica Mundi. He also performed with various orchestras including the Russian State Academic Symphony Orchestra, Saint Petersburg Philharmonic and Moscow Virtuosi, Mariinsky Theatre Orchestra, Orchestre philharmonique de Strasbourg, Porto National Orchestra and other. He had numerous performances in other countries of the world including Belgium, Great Britain, the Netherlands, the United States and France where he played at such concert halls as Concertgebouw in Amsterdam and Parisian City of Music and Salle Pleyel as well as Brussels's Centre for Fine Arts . As of 2009 he is a student at the Paris Conservatory. In 2010 he represented his nation at the Eurovision Young Musicians 2010 contest in Vienna.

References

External links

Living people
People from Dzyatlava
Cellists
Eurovision Young Musicians Finalists
Year of birth missing (living people)
Prize-winners of the Queen Elisabeth Competition